DR SMILE is a brand by the German startup Urban Technology GmbH based in Berlin.

History 
DrSmile was founded in 2016 in Berlin by Jens Urbaniak and Christopher von Wedemeyer. Urbaniak worked for Rocket Internet and is co-founder of Go Butler, and von Wedemeyer is an alumnus of the Frankfurt School of Finance & Management and previously worked as an analyst. In July 2020 it was announced that Swiss dental implant manufacturer Straumann bought a majority stake in the start-up and secured an option on the remaining shares. In May 2022, DrSmile acquired PlusDental for €131-million.

Company 
DrSmile holds locations in numerous cities, such as Berlin, Düsseldorf, Frankfurt, Hamburg, Cologne, Munich, Nuremberg, Stuttgart or Hannover. The company works with a partner network of dentists and orthodontists.

Treatment 
DrSmile focuses on aesthetic dental treatments with invisible aligners. Those are used to correct minor and medium malposition of teeth. Before the therapy, patients are examined by a dentist to show if their teeth, gum and jaw allow the procedure. If necessary, the dentist will create an X-Ray image. A 3D simulation of the dentition will illustrate the possible changes through the procedure. Subsequently, patients get their aligners delivered to their homes and have to exchange them every two weeks. There are control appointments scheduled in the middle and the end of the treatment, in addition patients send a weekly selfie to their dentist as well as monitor their progress through an app. The aligners are produced with a 3D printer.

Criticism 
Companies like DrSmile have been criticised by dentists for their lack of medical consultation and examination. However, this criticism goes out mostly to concepts where patients take a print of their teeth at home without seeing a dentist, while DrSmile works in cooperation with dentists and orthodontists and distances itself from procedures which don't involve professional medical consultation.

References  
 

Dentistry
Teeth